Dexter Community Schools is a school district headquartered in Dexter, Michigan.

Schools
Dexter High School (grades 9-12)
Mill Creek Middle School (grades 7-8)
Creekside Intermediate School (grades 5-6)
Wylie Elementary School (grades 3-4)
Beacon Elementary School (grades K-2)
Anchor Elementary School (grades K-2)

External links
 Dexter Community Schools

Education in Washtenaw County, Michigan
School districts in Michigan